Ali Akbar Mehrabian (born 1969) is an Iranian politician who is the current Minister of Energy.

He was the minister of industries and mines from 2 November 2007 to 15 May 2011. In 2011, it was announced that ministry of industries and mines would be merged with ministry of commerce, and Mehrabian would leave the cabinet afterward.

Early life and education
Mehrabian was born in 1969 in Isfahan, Iran. His family is from Isfahan. Mehrabi studied at Shiraz University and Tehran university. He obtained his master degree in economic science from Tehran University  .

Ministerial activities
As a minister, Mehrabian travelled the world promoting Iran's commercial interests in friendly countries such as Qatar, Belarus, Egypt and Venezuela. He involved in the discussions of a potential World Oil Bank involving Russia and Venezuela, and agreed on a cooperation protocol with the Democratic Republic of the Congo. He also promoted Iran's bilateral links and financial support for Cuba.

He expressed deep concern over the non-adherence of industrial states to their commitments to control the emission of greenhouse gases.

He implemented policies to encourage production of cars powered by compressed natural gas (CNG). Because Iran suffers from a lack of refining capacity, gasoline is rationed. Hundreds of thousands of  gasoline-powered vehicles are also being converted to use a bi-fuel system allowing CNG as an alternative fuel. He encouraged developments under which cars with Iranian content would be built in Egypt and Syria.

Following deadly crashes of imported aircraft, he also hoped to develop domestic production of aircraft. He promoted production of steel, copper, and coal. He implemented policies pressuring companies alleged to have links with businesses who trade with Israel, such as Coca-Cola, Nestle and Benetton.

References

External link

}}

1975 births
Living people
Government ministers of Iran
Politicians convicted of fraud
Presidential aides of Iran